Alexander Rutherford Knight (24 January 1899 – 8 April 1986) was a New Zealand cricketer who played first-class cricket for Otago from 1919 to 1943.

Alec Knight was born in Dunedin. He played 51 first-class matches, mostly as an opening batsman.  He scored 56 and 152 (his only first-class century) for Otago against Canterbury in 1940–41. He died in Auckland, aged 87.

See also
 List of Otago representative cricketers

References

External links
 Alec Knight at Cricinfo

1899 births
1986 deaths
New Zealand cricketers
Otago cricketers